Wang Chao (born January 21, 1964, in Nanjing) is a Chinese film director and screenwriter, sometimes considered part of the loosely defined "sixth generation."  Wang began his career serving as an assistant director to the fifth generation auteur, Chen Kaige, working with the elder director on epics like Farewell My Concubine and The Emperor and the Assassin. At the same time, he began to write fiction including several short stories and novellas, one of which would later go on to serve sa the basis of Wang's directorial debut, The Orphan of Anyang.

With Orphan, Wang Chao would begin what was the first film of a trilogy of films based on modern life in China. He completed the trilogy with 2004's Day and Night and 2006's Luxury Car.

His 2014 film Fantasia was selected to compete in the Un Certain Regard section at the 2014 Cannes Film Festival.

Filmography

References

External links 

 Wang Chao at the Chinese Movie Database

1964 births
Living people
Artists from Nanjing
Film directors from Jiangsu
Screenwriters from Jiangsu
Beijing Film Academy alumni
Writers from Nanjing